Haemophilia A (or hemophilia A) is a genetic deficiency in clotting factor VIII, which causes increased bleeding and usually affects males. In the majority of cases it is inherited as an X-linked recessive trait, though there are cases which arise from spontaneous mutations.

Factor VIII medication may be used to treat and prevent bleeding in people with haemophilia A.

Signs and symptoms
In terms of the symptoms of haemophilia A, there are internal or external bleeding episodes. Individuals with more severe haemophilia have more severe and more frequent bleeding, while others with mild haemophilia typically have more minor symptoms except after surgery or serious trauma. Moderate haemophiliacs have variable symptoms which manifest along a spectrum between severe and mild forms.

Prolonged bleeding from a venepuncture or heelprick is another common early sign of haemophilia, these signs may lead to blood tests which indicate haemophilia. In other people, especially those with moderate or mild haemophilia, any trauma will lead to the first serious bleed. Haemophilia leads to a severely increased risk of prolonged bleeding from common injuries, or in severe cases bleeding may be spontaneous and without obvious cause. Bleeding may occur anywhere in the body, superficial bleeding such as those caused by abrasions, or shallow lacerations may be prolonged and the scab may easily be broken up due to the lack of fibrin, which may cause re-bleeding. While superficial bleeding is troublesome, some of the more serious sites of bleeding are:
 Joints
 Muscles
 Digestive tract
 Brain

Muscle and joint haemorrhages – or haemarthrosis – are indicative of haemophilia, while digestive tract and cerebral haemorrhages are also germane to other coagulation disorders. Though typically not life-threatening, joint bleeding is one of the most serious symptoms of haemophilia. Repeated bleeds into a joint capsule can cause permanent joint damage and disfigurement resulting in chronic arthritis and disability. Joint damage is not a result of blood in the capsule but rather the healing process. When blood in the joint is broken down by enzymes in the body, the bone in that area is also degraded, this exerts a lot of pain upon the person affected by the disease.

Complications
One therapeutic conundrum is the development of inhibitor antibodies against factor VIII due to frequent infusions. These develop as the body recognises the infused factor VIII as foreign, as the body does not produce its own copy. In these individuals, activated factor VII, a precursor to factor VIII in the coagulation cascade, can be infused as a treatment for haemorrhage in individuals with haemophilia and antibodies against replacement factor VIII.

Oral Manifestations 
The oral manifestations are characterized by frequent bleeding of multiple sites, frequently seen as gingival and postextraction haemorrhages. The symptoms depend on the severity of haemophilia. In the case of severe haemophilia, patients may complain of multiple oral bleeding episodes throughout their life. Haemophilia patients are considered to be a special group of patients as routinely done procedures may be fatal in them. It was seen that almost 14% of all haemophilia patients and 30% of cases with a mild type of haemophilia have been diagnosed early following an episode of severe oral bleeding, of which the most common sites were the labial frenum and the tongue.

Genetics

Haemophilia A is inherited as an X-linked recessive trait. It occurs in males and in homozygous females (which is only possible in the daughters of a haemophilic male and a carrier or haemophiliac female). However, mild haemophilia A is known to occur in heterozygous females due to X-inactivation, so it is recommended that levels of factor VIII and IX be measured in all known or potential carriers prior to surgery and in the event of clinically significant bleeding.

About 5-10% of people with haemophilia A are affected because they make a dysfunctional version of the factor VIII protein, while the remainder are affected because they produce factor VIII in insufficient amounts (quantitative deficiency). Of those who have severe deficiency (defined as <1% activity of factor VIII), 45-50% have the same mutation, an inversion within the factor VIII gene that results in total elimination of protein production.

Since both forms of haemophilia can be caused by a variety of different mutations, initial diagnosis and classification is done by measurement of protein activity rather than by genetic tests, though genetic tests are recommended for testing of family members once a known case of haemophilia is identified. Approximately 30% of patients have no family history; their disease is presumably caused by new mutations.

Diagnosis

The diagnosis of haemophilia A may be suspected as coagulation testing reveals an increased partial thromboplastin time (PTT) in the context of a normal prothrombin time (PT) and bleeding time. PTT tests are the first blood test done when haemophilia is indicated. However, the diagnosis is made in the presence of very low levels of factor VIII. A family history is frequently present, although not essential. Recently, genetic testing has been made available to determine an individual's risk of attaining or passing on haemophilia. Diagnosis of haemophilia A also includes a severity level, which can range from mild to severe based on the amount of active and functioning factor VIII detected in the blood. Factor VIII levels do not typically change throughout an individual's lifetime. Severe haemophilia A is the most common severity, occurring in the majority of affected people. Individuals with mild haemophilia often experience few or no bleeding episodes except in the case of serious trauma (i.e. tooth extraction, or surgery).

Severity
There are numerous different mutations which can cause haemophilia A, due to differences in changes to the factor VIII gene (and the resulting protein). Individuals with haemophilia often have some level of active clotting factor. Individuals with less than 1% active factor are classified as having severe haemophilia, those with 1–5% active factor have moderate haemophilia, and those with mild haemophilia have between 5–40% of normal levels of active clotting factor.

Differential diagnosis
Two of the most common differential diagnoses are haemophilia B which is a deficiency in Factor IX and von Willebrand Disease which is a deficiency in von Willebrand factor (needed for the proper functioning of Factor VIII); haemophilia C is also considered.

Treatment

In regards to the treatment of this genetic disorder, most individuals with severe haemophilia require regular supplementation with intravenous recombinant or plasma concentrate Factor VIII. The preventative treatment regime is highly variable and individually determined. In children, an easily accessible intravenous port may have to be inserted to minimise frequent traumatic intravenous cannulation. These devices have made prophylaxis in haemophilia much easier for families because the problems of finding a vein for infusion several times a week are eliminated. However, there are risks involved with their use, the most worrisome being that of infection, studies differ but some show an infection rate that is high. These infections can usually be treated with intravenous antibiotics but sometimes the device must be removed, also, there are other studies that show a risk of clots forming at the tip of the catheter, rendering it useless. Some individuals with severe haemophilia, and most with moderate and mild haemophilia, treat only as needed without a regular prophylactic schedule. Mild haemophiliacs often manage their condition with desmopressin, a drug which releases stored factor VIII from blood vessel walls.

Dental considerations 
The inferior alveolar nerve block should only be given after raising clotting factor levels by appropriate replacement therapy, as there is a risk of bleeding into the muscles along with potential airway compromise due to a haematoma in the retromolar or pterygoid space. The intraligamental technique or interosseous technique should be considered instead of the mandibular block. Articaine has been used as a buccal infiltration to anaesthetize the lower molar teeth. A lingual infiltration also requires appropriate factor replacement since the injection is into an area with a rich plexus of blood vessels and the needle is not adjacent to bone.

Gene therapy
In December 2017, it was reported that doctors had used a new form of gene therapy to treat haemophilia A.

Monoclonal antibodies 
Monoclonal antibody emicizumab has been approved by the FDA in 2017 for therapy of hemophilia A.

Prognosis 
Two Dutch studies have followed haemophilia patients for a number of years. Both studies found that viral infections were common in haemophiliacs due to the frequent blood transfusions which put them at risk of acquiring blood borne infections, such as HIV, hepatitis B and hepatitis C. In the latest study which followed patients from 1992 to 2001, the male life expectancy was 59 years. If cases with known viral infections were excluded, the life expectancy was 72, close to that of the general population. 26% of the cases died from AIDS and 22% from hepatitis C. However, these statistics for prognosis are unreliable as there has been marked improvement of infection control and efficacy of anti-retroviral drugs since these studies were done.

Epidemiology
Haemophilia A occurs in approximately 1 in 5,000 males, while the incidence of haemophilia B is 1 in 30,000 in the male population, of these, 85% have haemophilia A and 15% have haemophilia B.

See also

References

Further reading

External links 

Haemophilia
Defects of enzyme cofactors
X-linked recessive disorders
Coagulopathies